The Virginia House of Delegates election of 2003 was held on Tuesday, November 4.

Election results

Overview

Detailed Results 

Party abbreviations: D - Democratic, R - Republican, I - Independent, IG - Independent Green, L - Libertarian

Note: Only House districts that were contested by more than one candidate, or that switched party control are included here.

See also 
 2003 United States elections
 2003 Virginia elections
 2003 Virginia Senate election

References 

House of Delegates
2003
Virginia